Condoliase (Hernicore) is a biopharmaceutical for the treatment of lumbar disc herniation.  It is an enzyme that degrades glycosaminoglycans.

Condoliase is derived from the enzyme mucopolysaccharidase from the bacteria Proteus vulgaris.

It was approved for use in Japan in 2018.

References 

Biopharmaceuticals